Badshahpur  is a village in Kapurthala district of Punjab State, India. The village is administrated by a Sarpanch, who is an elected representative.

Demography 
According to the report published by Census India in 2011, Badshahpur has a total number of 145 houses and population of 817 of which include 419 males and 398 females. Literacy rate of Badshahpur is 69.71%, lower than state average of 75.84%. The population of children under the age of 6 years is 104 which is 12.73% of total population of Badshahpur, and child sex ratio is approximately 1167 higher than state average of 846.

Population data

Air travel connectivity 
The closest airport to the village is Sri Guru Ram Dass Jee International Airport.

Villages in Kapurthala

External links
  Villages in Kapurthala
 Kapurthala Villages List

References

Villages in Kapurthala district